Mohamed Reda Boumechra (born 3 June 1997 in Oran) is an Algerian footballer who plays for Algerian Ligue Professionnelle 1 club USM Alger.

Club career
In the summer of 2016, Boumechra signed a four-year contract with USM Alger.

References

External links

 

1997 births
Algeria youth international footballers
Algerian footballers
Algerian Ligue Professionnelle 1 players
ASM Oran players
Living people
People from Oran
USM Alger players
Association football midfielders
21st-century Algerian people